Bertrand Andrieu (24 November 1761 – 6 December 1822) was a French engraver of medals. He was born in Bordeaux. In France, he was considered as the restorer of the art, which had declined after the time of Louis XIV. During the last twenty years of his life, the French government commissioned him to undertake every major work of importance.

References

Sources
 .

External links

 

1761 births
1822 deaths
Artists from Bordeaux
18th-century French engravers
19th-century French engravers
19th-century French male artists
French medallists
18th-century French male artists